The Elm River is a  river in western Houghton County on the Upper Peninsula of Michigan in the United States.  It is a tributary of Lake Superior.

See also
List of rivers of Michigan

References

Michigan  Streamflow Data from the USGS

Rivers of Michigan
Rivers of Houghton County, Michigan
Tributaries of Lake Superior